Diarra Sylla (born 30 January 2001), also known as simply Diarra, is a French-Senegalese singer, dancer, actress, compositor and model. She was part of the global pop group Now United, representing Senegal, and left the group in 2020 to pursue her solo career.

Biography 
Sylla was born in Paris, France, but later moved to Dakar, Senegal where she grew up. She is estranged from her biological father, and has only met him a handful of times. During her childhood, she mainly lived with her cousin, as her mother frequently travelled. After performing onstage when she was 6, she decided that her ultimate goal was to become a singer.

Sylla speaks three languages fluently, French, Wolof and English; she also speaks Turkish, but not fluently.

Career

2015–2016: Sen P'tit Gallé 
After four years of discouraging her to pursue music, her mother finally allowed her to participate in the 2016 Sen P'tit Gallé, one of the most prominent singing competitions in Africa. She won first place and gained instant recognition.

2017–2020: Now United 
Sylla first heard about Now United through her sister and encouraged her to audition. After her successful audition, she was revealed as part of Now United's final lineup on 12 November 2017, being the group's only representative from Africa.

In March 2020, Sylla announced that she was preparing her solo career.

On 5 September 2020, she confirmed in a Hollywood Fix interview in Los Angeles that she had officially departed from the group to pursue solo endeavors. However, even after announcing her departure from the group, she appeared and even sang in some clips of the group.  Such as "Pas Le Choix", "Hewale" and "All Around The World".

2021–present: Solo career 
On 25 February 2021, Sylla released "Set Free", the debut song of her solo career.

On 12 March 2021, Bruno Martini released "Ain't Worried", a song with Luísa Sonza and Sylla.

On 15 September 2021, Sylla released "Catch a Vibe", a song in collaboration with singer Marieme.

On 01 April 2022, Diarra released "Contagious", a song in collaboration with JayUncut.

Discography

As lead artist

Influence 
Sylla is the most followed Senegalese woman on Instagram, with over 3 million followers on the social network.

She was  featured on the cover and featured as a global icon of the North American magazine, Bloom Xo, in June 2021.

Appeared on the cover of and featured in the North American magazine, Grind Pretty Magazine, in the December/Winter 2021.

Filmography

Documentaries

In July 2021 Sylla appeared I  one of the episodes of the documentary "Trace Trends", which deals with Afro-urban culture.

In September 2021, Sylla made a special appearance on the WebSerie on the YouTube platform of the channel "ElhadjTV".

Awards and nominations

With Now United

References

External links 
 

2001 births
Living people
Musicians from Dakar
21st-century Senegalese women singers
Senegalese female dancers
Now United members
French female dancers
French emigrants to Senegal